Before the Acts of Union 1707, the barons of the shire of Inverness elected commissioners to represent them in the unicameral Parliament of Scotland and in the Convention of the Estates.

From 1708 Inverness-shire was represented by one Member of Parliament in the House of Commons of Great Britain.

List of shire commissioners

 1628–33, 1639–40, 1644–47: Sir John Mackenzie, 1st Baronet of Tarbat
 1630: Sir Robert Gordon, 1st Baronet
 1646–47: Laird of Kynneries  
 1646–47, 1649: Sir James Fraser of Brae 
 1649: Sir Robert Munro, 3rd Baronet of Foulis
 1649–51: William Fraser of Culbokie 
 1661–63: Sir John Urquhart of Cromarty 
 1661–63: Collene McKenzie of Reidcastell 
 1665 convention: William Robertson of Inchis 
1667 convention: not represented
 1669–74: Lauchlan McIntosh of Torrcastle  
 1669–74: John Forbes of Culloden   
 1678 (convention): Hew Fraser of Belladrum 
 1678 (convention): John Macleod of Dunvegan  
 1881–82(in lieu of the Laird of Dunvegan, ill), 1685–86: Laughlan McIntosh of Torcastle 
 1685–86: Hugh Fraser the younger of Belladrum 
 1689 (convention), 1689-1702: Duncan Forbes of Culloden 
 1689 (convention), 1689–1701, 1702–05: Ludovick Grant of that Ilk
 1702-07: Alexander Grant of that Ilk

References

See also
 List of constituencies in the Parliament of Scotland at the time of the Union

Shires represented in the Parliament of Scotland (to 1707)
Constituencies disestablished in 1707
1707 disestablishments in Scotland
Politics of Highland (council area)
History of the Scottish Highlands